Isar ul Haq Qasmi (who died in 1991) was a Pakistani Islamic cleric, preacher and a member of Sipah-e-Sahaba Pakistan. He had been member of the National Assembly of Pakistan between 1990 and 1993 representing Jhang constituency.

Born in 1964 to a family which migrated from Ambala and settled in Samundri, Punjab, at the Partition, with a father who worked in the Middle East for years (like many SSP members), he was educated in three madrasas in Lahore, and at first went for a business career but then decided to become khatib (preacher) in an Okara mosque from 1985 onward, where he also established a madrasa, and he would soon gain a reputation for his clashes with the  local police, before moving to Jhang at the request of Haq Nawaz Jhangvi, to preach in one of the market-towns of the district.

He was elected to the National Assembly of Pakistan as a candidate of Islami Jamhoori Ittehad (IJI) in the 1990 Pakistani general election. He received 62,486 and defeated Nawab Amanullah Khan Sial of Pakistan Democratic Alliance (PDA).

He was killed in 1991 during a by-election in Jhang.

See also
 Azam Tariq
 Haq Nawaz Jhangvi

References

1991 deaths
Pakistani Islamic religious leaders
Pakistani Islamists
Pakistani MNAs 1990–1993
People from Jhang District
Assassinated Pakistani people
Assassinated religious leaders
Pakistani far-right politicians
1964 births
Deobandis
Sipah-e-Sahaba Pakistan people
Chiefs of Sipah-e-Sahaba Pakistan
People from Samundri